Cnemaspis argus, also known commonly as the Argus gecko, the Argus rock gecko, Dring's gecko, and the Lawit Mountain rock gecko, is a species of lizard in the family Gekkonidae. The species is endemic to Peninsular Malaysia.

Etymology
The specific name, argus, refers to Argus, the many-eyed giant in Greek mythology, an allusion to the ocelli (eye-spots) of this species.

Geographic range
C. argus is found in northern Terengganu state, Peninsular Malaysia.

Habitat
The preferred natural habitat of C. argus is forest with large granite rocks, at altitudes of

Description

Behavior
C. argus is diurnal.

Reproduction
C. argus is oviparous.

References

Further reading
Dring JCM (1979). "Amphibians and reptiles from northern Trengganu, Malaysia, with descriptions of two new geckos: Cnemaspis and Cyrtodactylus ". Bulletin of the British Museum (Natural History), Zoology series 34 (5): 181–241. (Cnemaspis argus, new species, pp. 218–222 + Plate 1, figure a).
Grismer LL, Quah ESH (2019). "An updated and annotated checklist of the lizards of Peninsular Malaysia, Singapore, and their adjacent archipelagos". Zootaxa 4545 (2): 230–248.
Rösler H (2000). "Kommentierte Liste der rezent, subrezent und fossil bekannten Geckotaxa (Reptilia: Gekkonomorpha)". Gekkota 2: 28–153. (Cnemaspis argus, p. 62). (in German).

argus
Reptiles described in 1979